Alexander Chisholm (1792?–1847) was a British portrait and historical painter.

Life
He was born at Elgin in the year 1792 or 1793, and at an early age was apprenticed by his father to a weaver at Peterhead.
He had a great aversion to the trade, and his predilection for art was so strong that he was accustomed to sketch figures upon the cloth on which he was occupied at the loom, and when his leisure permitted him to resort to the sea-shore, he found great pleasure in sketching on the smooth sand.
When about fourteen years of age, he walked from Peterhead to Aberdeen, where he received his first lessons in light and shade.
At this time there was a meeting of the Synod, the members of which he was permitted to sketch; and his work gave such satisfaction, that he was forthwith commissioned to paint it, but this he was compelled to decline, as he was totally ignorant of the use of colours.

He must have employed his leisure profitably, for when about twenty years of age he went to Edinburgh, where he was patronized by the Earls of Elgin and Buchan, and was subsequently appointed an instructor at the Royal Scottish Academy.
In 1818, he went to London, still under the patronage of the Earl of Buchan, and met with much encouragement.
In 1829, he became an Associate Exhibitor of the Water-Colour Society and frequently sent works to that Institution.
His favourite department of art was history, hut he also painted portraits with eminent success. Having suffered from severe illness during nine years before his death, his later productions do not exhibit that degree of vigour which characterize his earlier works. 'The Pedlar,' a water-colour painting by him, is in the South Kensington Museum.

He died at Rothesay, in the Isle of Bute, on 3 October 1847.

Works
The following are some of his most important works exhibited at the Royal Academy:

Boys with a Burning Glass. 1822.
The Cut Foot. 1823.
Baptism of Ben Jonson's Daughter (wiih portraits of Shakespeare, Jonsonj Beaumont, Fletcher and Raleigh). 1837.
The Lords of the Congregation taking the oath of the Covenant. 1842.
The Minister and his Wife concealing the Scottish Regalia in the Church (his last work). 1846.

Notes

References

External Links
 Paintings for Fisher's Drawing Room Scrap Books with poetical illustrations by Letitia Elizabeth Landon:
1836: , engraved by E Portbury.
1837: , engraved by Timothy Stansfeld Engleheart.
1839: , engraved by P Lightfoot.

1792 births
1847 deaths
People from Elgin, Moray
Scottish watercolourists
19th-century Scottish painters
Scottish male painters
19th-century Scottish male artists